Dragosinjci is a village in the municipality of Kraljevo, western-central Serbia. According to the 2002 census, the village has a population of 672 people.

References

Populated places in Raška District